When Hell Broke Loose is a 1958 World War II war film directed by Kenneth G. Crane and starring Charles Bronson. It was co-written by Ib Melchior.

Plot 
Steve Boland (Charles Bronson) is a cynical minor criminal drafted into the US Army during World War II. He has an unspectacular military career with his criminal past getting him into trouble but he comes into his own when his criminal expertise gives him unparalleled opportunities during the American occupation of Germany.

When Werwolf German infiltrators, saboteurs and assassins dressed in American uniform parachute behind the American lines, Boland's superiors neither believe nor trust him. Boland becomes a proficient one man army. He realises that everything happens for a reason.

Cast

See also
Verboten!, a 1959 film with similar elements

External links

1958 films
American black-and-white films
Paramount Pictures films
American World War II films
Films directed by Kenneth G. Crane
Films scored by Albert Glasser
1950s English-language films